The General Electric T901 (GE3000) is a turboshaft engine in the  class currently under development for the United States Army's Improved Turbine Engine Program (ITEP).
The ITEP plans after 2025 to re-engine over 1,300 Sikorsky UH-60 Black Hawk and more than 600 Boeing AH-64 Apache, and power the Future Attack Reconnaissance Aircraft.

Development
Since 2010, General Electric has spent more than $300 million to develop and test T901-specific technologies. In 2016, the Army awarded GE Aviation a $102-million, 24-month contract for the T901 preliminary design review for which a team of more than 100 engineers was assembled.
The GE-funded prototype six month testing was completed in October 2017, meeting or exceededing the ITEP performance and growth requirements.

On 1 February 2019, the US Army selected the GE T901 as the winner of the ITEP program.
Engineering completion and manufacturing development are contracted for $517 million, for August 2024 before low-rate production.

By March 2022, the first turboshaft had begun bench tests at GE’s Lynn, Massachusetts facility.

Design

GE has maintained the T700 single spool architecture for modularity and reliability with additive manufacturing and ceramic matrix composites (CMCs) from the CFM LEAP, GE9X or GE ATP.
Additive manufactured components lower weight by minimizing attaching features in assemblies and allows more advanced aerodynamic shapes for better engine performance, reliability and durability.
More durable and higher temperature CMCs replace metal alloys, needing less cooling and improving engine efficiency.

Applications
 Bell 360 Invictus
 Sikorsky Raider X

Specifications

See also

References

External links
 General Electric T901 page on GE Aviation site

T901
2010s turboshaft engines